Robert Stepneth or Stepney (by 1513 – 1557) was an English politician.

He was a Member (MP) of the Parliament of England for St. Albans in 1555.

References

1557 deaths
English MPs 1555
Year of birth uncertain